40 Eridani is a triple star system in the constellation of Eridanus, abbreviated 40 Eri. It has the Bayer designation Omicron2 Eridani, which is Latinized from ο2 Eridani and abbreviated Omicron2 Eri or ο2 Eri. Based on parallax measurements taken by the Gaia mission, it is about 16.3 light-years from the Sun.

The primary star of the system, designated 40 Eridani A and named Keid, is easily visible to the naked eye. It is orbited by a binary pair whose two components are designated 40 Eridani B and C, and which were discovered on January 31, 1783, by William Herschel. It was again observed by Friedrich Struve in 1825 and by Otto Struve in 1851.

In 1910, it was discovered that although component B was a faint star, it was white in color. This meant that it had to be a small star; in fact it was a white dwarf, the first discovered. Although it is neither the closest white dwarf, nor the brightest in the night sky, it is by far the easiest to observe; it is nearly three magnitudes brighter than Van Maanen's Star, the nearest solitary white dwarf, and unlike the companions of Procyon and Sirius it is not swamped in the glare of a much brighter primary.

Nomenclature
40 Eridani is the system's Flamsteed designation and ο² Eridani (Latinised to Omicron2 Eridani) its Bayer designation. The designations of the sub-components –  B and C – derive from the convention used by the Washington Multiplicity Catalog (WMC) for multiple star systems, and adopted by the International Astronomical Union (IAU).  also bears the variable star designation DY Eridani.

The system bore the traditional name Keid derived from the Arabic word قيض meaning "the eggshells," alluding to its neighbour Beid (Arabic "egg"). In 2016, the IAU organized a Working Group on Star Names (WGSN)
to catalogue and standardize proper names for stars. The WGSN decided to attribute proper names to individual stars rather than entire multiple systems.
It approved the name Keid for the component  on 12 September 2016 and it is now so included in the List of IAU-approved Star Names.

Properties

40 Eridani A is a main-sequence dwarf of spectral type K1, 40 Eridani B is a 9th magnitude white dwarf of spectral type DA4, and 40 Eridani C is an 11th magnitude red dwarf flare star of spectral type M4.5e. When component B was a main-sequence star, it is thought to have been the most massive member of the system, but ejected most of its mass before it became a white dwarf. B and C orbit each other approximately 400 AU from the primary star, A. Their orbit has a semimajor axis of 35 AU and is rather elliptical with an orbital eccentricity of 0.410).

As seen from the 40 Eridani system, the Sun is a 3.4-magnitude star in Hercules, near the border with Serpens Caput.

Potential for life
The habitable zone of  where a planet could exist with liquid water, is near 0.68  from A. At this distance a planet would complete a revolution in 223 Earth days (according to the third of Kepler's laws) and  would appear nearly 20% wider than the Sun does on Earth. An observer on a planet in the  system would see the B-C pair as unusually bright white and reddish-orange stars in the night sky – magnitudes −8 and −6, slightly brighter than the appearance of Venus seen from Earth as the evening star.

It is unlikely that habitable planets exist around  because they would have been sterilized by its evolution into a white dwarf. This would be lethal to Earth-type life on planets near the flare star.

Search for planets

40 Eridani A shows periodic radial velocity variations, which may be caused by a planetary companion. The 42-day period is close to the stellar rotation period, making the planetary nature of the signal difficult to confirm. A 2018 study found that most evidence supports a planetary origin for the signal, but this has remained controversial, with a 2021 study characterizing the signal as a false positive. As of 2022, the cause of the radial velocity variations remained inconclusive.

A study in 2023 concluded that the radial velocity signal very likely does originate from stellar activity, and not from a planet.

See also
 40 Eridani in fiction

Notes

References

External links
 Keid at Jim Kaler's STARS.
 40 (Omicron2) Eridani 3 at solstation.com.
 Omicron(2) Eridani entry at the Internet Stellar Database.

Emission-line stars
K-type main-sequence stars
M-type main-sequence stars
White dwarfs
Eridani, 40
Triple star systems
Hypothetical planetary systems

Keid
Eridanus (constellation)
Eridani, Omicron2
1325
Durchmusterung objects
Eridani, 40
0166
026965
019849
Eridani, DY